ELEAGUE Season 1 was the inaugural season of the ELEAGUE Counter-Strike: Global Offensive league, running from May 24, 2016, to July 30, 2016. This was the first CS:GO league to be broadcast on cable television in the United States, airing on TBS and streaming online on Twitch. The season featured 24 teams from across the world to compete in a 10-week season, which included a regular season and a playoffs.

On September 24, 2015 Turner Broadcasting announced that it was partnering with talent agency WME/IMG for a new esports project. Matches were broadcast live on TBS on Friday nights, starting on May 27, 2016. The broadcast was simultaneously available on the online streaming service Twitch. Matches were played at the Turner Studios facility in Atlanta, Georgia, United States. The semifinals and final were played at the Cobb Energy Center.

Turner partnered with online streaming services to bring additional video content. One such program featured the Renegades' move from Australia to the United States. Additional content was be available on Bleacher Report's Team Stream App. The finals between Virtus.pro and Fnatic was also broadcast on Twitter. The production and broadcast team received positive reviews.

The season started with Luminosity Gaming sweeping Renegades in Group A's best of two and the first televised CS:GO match featured Luminosity Gaming defeating Cloud9 2–1. The season ended with Virtus.pro defeating Fnatic 2–0 to take home the first edition of ELEAGUE. At the end of the season 1 finals, analyst Richard Lewis announced that the second season of ELEAGUE would air on October 7, 2016.

Teams competing
The first season's full team list was announced on April 21, 2016.

There were a total number of 24 teams competing in the league and it offers about US$1,400,000 in prize money per season. It debuted on May 24, 2016. 23 invited teams and 1 team from the qualifier will compete in ELEAGUE

Broadcast talent
Host
 Richard Lewis
Interviewers
 Chris Puckett
 Rachel "Seltzer" Quirico
Commentators
 James Bardolph
 Anders Blume
 Daniel "ddk" Kapadia
 Auguste "Semmler" Massonnat
Analysts
 Mohamad "m0E" Assad
 Dustin "dusT" Mouret
 Jason "moses" O'Toole
 Duncan "Thorin" Shields
Observers
 Heather "sapphiRe" Garozzo
 DJ "Prius" Kuntz
Producer
 Jason "Alchemist" Baker

Format
Teams will be separated into six groups of four. Every week, one group will compete at a time. Tuesday and Wednesday will consist of group play to determine the standings of the group. One win gives one point to the winning team and a loss gives zero points. Each team will play the other three teams in its group twice. On Thursday, the group playoffs begin with the group semifinals, in which the team with the most points faces off against the team with the fewest points and the other two teams facing off against each other. The semifinals are in a best of three format, so the first team to win two games moves on to the group finals. The winner of those two series will face off Friday, live on TBS in the group finals, which is also a best of three. The winner of that game will move into the playoffs and the loser of that game will go into the Last Chance Qualifier bracket. In addition, the top two third place teams will also go into the Last Chance Qualifier to accommodate the last two spots in the bracket. A third place team is determined by the team with the higher seed of the two losing teams in the group semifinals.

The Last Chance Qualifier consists of eight teams – the six group runners-up and the top two third place teams. Teams will play in a single elimination bracket and each match is in a best of three format. The bracket continues until two teams remain. These two teams will earn spots in the Playoffs bracket.

The Playoffs consists of the six group winners and the top two teams out of the Last Chance Qualifier. This bracket is also a single elimination, best of three format. Teams will play and winners will advance in the bracket until a winner is decided.

Group stage

Group A

Group A Bracket

Group B

Group B Bracket

Group C

Group C Bracket

Group D

Group D Bracket

Group E

Group E Bracket

Group F

Group F Bracket

Third place team standings
The top two teams in this list will join the second place teams in the Last Chance Qualifier bracket. However, since Luminosity Gaming and SK Gaming were disqualified, Cloud9 took Luminosity's first seed and Renegades took Cloud9's second seed. Thus, Gambit Gaming was considered the second team in the third-place rankings.

Regular season standings

†Game was broadcast on TBS.

Last Chance bracket

† Game was broadcast on TBS.

Playoffs

† Game was broadcast on TBS.

Final standings

1Virtus.pro and mousesports received an additional $10,000 for winning the Last Chance Qualifier

2Luminosity Gaming and SK Gaming were disqualified from the tournament due to SK Gaming letting go of its Danish squad and acquiring Luminosity Gaming's team. This does "not comply with" ELEAGUE rules, according to the commissioner at ELEAGUE. Cloud9 took Luminosity's spot in the playoffs, Renegades took Cloud9's spot in the Last Chance Qualifier, and Gambit Gaming took SK Gaming's spot in the third place group stage standings, which lead the Russians to the Last Chance Qualifier.

3Luminosity Gaming (now with SK Gaming) and SK Gaming (now with Team X) were still eligible for unspecified winnings, despite the rulebook stating that disqualified teams forfeit all potential winnings.

References

External links
 Official website

2016 in esports
Sports competitions in Atlanta
2016 in American sports
2016 in American television